Bolondo is a coastal town in Equatorial Guinea.

Populated places in Litoral (Equatorial Guinea)